NK Vitez is football club based in Vitez, Bosnia and Herzegovina. The club plays in Second League of the Federation of Bosnia and Herzegovina - Center.

The club's crest has the sword in front of a football ball. It also features the year when the club was established.

History
The club was established after the second World War in 1947 under the name of Radnik. Aside of that name, it was also once called Sloga, but from 1954 it has the name Vitez. Two times, they also had the name of the sponsor along their club name. In 2004 they were called NK Vitez FIS and in 2009 they were called NK Ecos Vitez. The first ever president of the club was Petar Paar.

Current squad
As of 23 July 2018

Managerial history
  Valentin Plavčić (2010–2013)
  Ante Miše (2013–2014)
  Husnija Arapović (2014)
  Ante Miše (2014–2015)
  Valentin Plavčić (2015)
  Branko Karačić (2015–2016)
  Slaven Musa (2016–2017)
  Ivica Bonić (2017)
  Branko Karačić (2017–2018)
  Ivica Bonić (2018)
  Vjeran Simunić (2018–2019)
  Veseljko Petrović (2019–present)

References

External links

 
Association football clubs established in 1947
Vitez
Vitez
Vitez
Sport in the Federation of Bosnia and Herzegovina
1947 establishments in Bosnia and Herzegovina